The Secretary of State for Energy Security and Net Zero is a Secretary of State in the Government of the United Kingdom, with responsibility for the Department for Energy Security and Net Zero. The incumbent is a member of the Cabinet of the United Kingdom.

The incumbent Secretary of State is Grant Shapps of the Conservative Party, who is the first holder of the position.

History 
On 7 February 2023, a government reshuffle meant that the Department for Business, Energy and Industrial Strategy was split up into separate departments. The Department for Energy Security and Net Zero took on the energy portfolio and policy functions from the Department for Business, Energy and Industrial Strategy. Grant Shapps was appointed the first Secretary of State for the department, having previously been the last holder of the office of Secretary of State for Business, Energy and Industrial Strategy from 2022 to 2023. The department was tasked by the Prime Minister, Rishi Sunak, with "securing our long-term energy supply, bringing down bills and halving inflation".

List

See also 
 Secretary of State for Energy and Climate Change - ministerial position from 2008 to 2016.
 Minister of State for Energy

References 

Lists of government ministers of the United Kingdom
Ministerial offices in the United Kingdom
Energy in the United Kingdom